ZPP may refer to:
 ZPP (complexity), zero-error probabilistic polynomial time
 Zinc protoporphyrin
 zirconium-potassium perchlorate, a pyrotechnic composition
 Związek Patriotów Polskich, a Polish communist political party

zpp may refer to:
 ISO 639:zpp, ISO 639-3 code for El Alto Zapotec